"Run Me Dry" is a song by American singer Bryson Tiller. It was released on July 25, 2017, as the second single from his second studio album, True to Self (2017). Tiller co-wrote the song with its producers Boi-1da and Allen Ritter.

Release
"Run Me Dry" is taken from Tiller's second studio album, True to Self, which was released in May 2017. It was sent to the rhythmic contemporary radio as the album's second single on July 25, 2017.

Music video
The music video for the song, directed by Hamish Stephenson, premiered via Tiller's Vevo channel on September 12, 2017.

Charts

Weekly charts

Certifications

Release history

References

2017 songs
2017 singles
RCA Records singles
Bryson Tiller songs
Songs written by Boi-1da
Song recordings produced by Boi-1da
Songs written by Allen Ritter
Songs written by Bryson Tiller
Song recordings produced by Allen Ritter